Pete Sampras defeated the defending champion Andre Agassi in the final, 6–4, 6–3, 4–6, 7–5 to win the men's singles tennis title at the 1995 US Open.

Seeds
The seeded players are listed below. Pete Sampras is the champion; others show the round in which they were eliminated.

  Andre Agassi (finalist)
  Pete Sampras (champion)
  Thomas Muster (fourth round)
  Boris Becker (semifinalist)
  Michael Chang (quarterfinalist)
  Goran Ivanišević (first round)
  Yevgeny Kafelnikov (third round)
  Michael Stich (fourth round)
  Thomas Enqvist (second round)
  Wayne Ferreira (first round)
  Sergi Bruguera (second round)
  Richard Krajicek (third round)
  Marc Rosset (fourth round)
  Jim Courier (semifinalist)
  Todd Martin (fourth round)
  Andrei Medvedev (second round)

Qualifying

Draw

Final eight

Section 1

Section 2

Section 3

Section 4

Section 5

Section 6

Section 7

Section 8

External links
 Association of Tennis Professionals (ATP) – 1995 US Open Men's Singles draw
1995 US Open – Men's draws and results at the International Tennis Federation

Men's singlesMen's singles
US Open (tennis) by year – Men's singles